

Peerage of England

|Duke of Cornwall (1337)||none||1537||1603||
|-
|Duke of Norfolk (1483)||Thomas Howard, 4th Duke of Norfolk||1554||1572||
|-
|Marquess of Northampton (1547)||William Parr, 1st Marquess of Northampton||1547||1571||
|-
|Marquess of Winchester (1551)||William Paulet, 1st Marquess of Winchester||1551||1572||
|-
|Earl of Arundel (1138)||Henry FitzAlan, 19th Earl of Arundel||1544||1580||
|-
|rowspan="2"|Earl of Oxford (1142)||John de Vere, 16th Earl of Oxford||1540||1562||Died
|-
|Edward de Vere, 17th Earl of Oxford||1562||1604||
|-
|rowspan="2"|Earl of Westmorland (1397)||Henry Neville, 5th Earl of Westmorland||1459||1564||Died
|-
|Charles Neville, 6th Earl of Westmorland||1564||1571||
|-
|rowspan="2"|Earl of Shrewsbury (1442)||Francis Talbot, 5th Earl of Shrewsbury||1538||1560||Died
|-
|George Talbot, 6th Earl of Shrewsbury||1560||1590||
|-
|rowspan="2"|Earl of Kent (1465)||Henry Grey, 4th Earl of Kent||1524||1562||Died
|-
|Reginald Grey, 5th Earl of Kent||1562||1573||
|-
|Earl of Derby (1485)||Edward Stanley, 3rd Earl of Derby||1521||1572||
|-
|Earl of Worcester (1514)||William Somerset, 3rd Earl of Worcester||1549||1589||
|-
|Earl of Cumberland (1525)||Henry Clifford, 2nd Earl of Cumberland||1542||1570||
|-
|rowspan="2"|Earl of Rutland (1525)||Henry Manners, 2nd Earl of Rutland||1543||1563||Died
|-
|Edward Manners, 3rd Earl of Rutland||1563||1587||
|-
|rowspan="2"|Earl of Huntingdon (1529)||Francis Hastings, 2nd Earl of Huntingdon||1544||1561||Died
|-
|Henry Hastings, 3rd Earl of Huntingdon||1561||1595||
|-
|Earl of Sussex (1529)||Thomas Radclyffe, 3rd Earl of Sussex||1557||1583||
|-
|rowspan="2"|Earl of Bath (1536)||John Bourchier, 2nd Earl of Bath||1539||1561||Died
|-
|William Bourchier, 3rd Earl of Bath||1561||1623||
|-
|Earl of Southampton (1547)||Henry Wriothesley, 2nd Earl of Southampton||1550||1581||
|-
|Earl of Bedford (1550)||Francis Russell, 2nd Earl of Bedford||1555||1585||
|-
|Earl of Pembroke (1551)||William Herbert, 1st Earl of Pembroke||1551||1570||
|-
|Earl of Devon (1553)||William Courtenay, de jure 3rd Earl of Devon||1557||1630||
|-
|Earl of Northumberland (1557)||Thomas Percy, 7th Earl of Northumberland||1557||1572||
|-
|Earl of Hertford (1559)||Edward Seymour, 1st Earl of Hertford||1559||1621||
|-
|Earl of Warwick (1561)||Ambrose Dudley, 1st Earl of Warwick||1561||1590||New creation
|-
|Earl of Leicester (1564)||Robert Dudley, 1st Earl of Leicester||1564||1588||New creation
|-
|Viscount Hereford (1550)||Walter Devereux, 2nd Viscount Hereford||1558||1576||
|-
|Viscount Montagu (1554)||Anthony Browne, 1st Viscount Montagu||1554||1592||
|-
|Viscount Howard of Bindon (1559)||Thomas Howard, 1st Viscount Howard of Bindon||1559||1582||
|-
|rowspan="2"|Baron Grey de Wilton (1295)||William Grey, 13th Baron Grey de Wilton||1520||1562||Died
|-
|Arthur Grey, 14th Baron Grey de Wilton||1562||1593||
|-
|Baron Clinton (1299)||Edward Clinton, 9th Baron Clinton||1517||1585||
|- 
|Baron Morley (1299)||Henry Parker, 11th Baron Morley||1556||1577||
|- 
|rowspan="2"|Baron Zouche of Haryngworth (1308)||George la Zouche, 10th Baron Zouche||1552||1569||Died
|- 
|Edward la Zouche, 11th Baron Zouche||1569||1625||
|- 
|rowspan="3"|Baron Audley of Heleigh (1313)||George Tuchet, 9th Baron Audley||1557||1560||Died
|- 
|Henry Tuchet, 10th Baron Audley||1560||1563||Died
|- 
|George Tuchet, 11th Baron Audley||1563||1617||
|- 
|Baron Cobham of Kent (1313)||William Brooke, 10th Baron Cobham||1558||1597||
|- 
|Baron Willoughby de Eresby (1313)||Catherine Willoughby, 12th Baroness Willoughby de Eresby||1526||1580||
|- 
|Baron Dacre (1321)||Gregory Fiennes, 10th Baron Dacre||1558||1594||
|- 
|rowspan="3"|Baron Greystock (1321)||William Dacre, 7th Baron Greystoke||1516||1563||Died
|- 
|Thomas Dacre, 8th Baron Greystoke||1563||1566||Died
|- 
|George Dacre, 9th Baron Greystoke||1566||1569||Died, Barony fell into abeyance
|- 
|Baron Bourchier (1342)||Anne Bourchier, 7th Baroness Bourchier||1540||1571||
|- 
|Baron Scrope of Bolton (1371)||Henry Scrope, 9th Baron Scrope of Bolton||1549||1591||
|- 
|Baron Bergavenny (1392)||Henry Nevill, 6th Baron Bergavenny||1536||1585||
|- 
|Baron Berkeley (1421)||Henry Berkeley, 7th Baron Berkeley||1534||1613||
|- 
|Baron Latimer (1432)||John Neville, 4th Baron Latimer||1543||1577||
|- 
|Baron Dudley (1440)||Edward Sutton, 4th Baron Dudley||1553||1586||
|- 
|Baron Saye and Sele (1447)||Richard Fiennes, 6th Baron Saye and Sele||1528||1573||
|- 
|Baron Stourton (1448)||John Stourton, 9th Baron Stourton||1557||1588||
|- 
|rowspan="2"|Baron Ogle (1461)||Robert Ogle, 6th Baron Ogle||1545||1562||Died
|- 
|Cuthbert Ogle, 7th Baron Ogle||1562||1597||
|- 
|Baron Mountjoy (1465)||James Blount, 6th Baron Mountjoy||1544||1582||
|- 
|rowspan="2"|Baron Willoughby de Broke (1491)||Elizabeth Willoughby, 3rd Baroness Willoughby de Broke||1535||1562||Died
|- 
|Fulke Greville, 4th Baron Willoughby de Broke||1562||1606||
|- 
|rowspan="2"|Baron Monteagle (1514)||Thomas Stanley, 2nd Baron Monteagle||1523||1560||Died
|-
|William Stanley, 3rd Baron Monteagle||1560||1581||
|-
|Baron Vaux of Harrowden (1523)||William Vaux, 3rd Baron Vaux of Harrowden||1556||1595||
|-
|rowspan="2"|Baron Sandys of the Vine (1529)||Thomas Sandys, 2nd Baron Sandys||1540||1560||Died
|-
|William Sandys, 3rd Baron Sandys||1560||1623||
|-
|Baron Burgh (1529)||William Burgh, 2nd Baron Burgh||1550||1584||
|-
|Baron Tailboys (1529)||Elizabeth Tailboys, 4th Baroness Tailboys of Kyme||1542||1563||Died, title extinct
|-
|Baron Windsor (1529)||Edward Windsor, 3rd Baron Windsor||1558||1574||
|-
|Baron Wentworth (1529)||Thomas Wentworth, 2nd Baron Wentworth||1551||1584||
|-
|rowspan="2"|Baron Mordaunt (1532)||John Mordaunt, 1st Baron Mordaunt||1532||1562||Died
|-
|John Mordaunt, 2nd Baron Mordaunt||1562||1571||
|-
|Baron Cromwell (1540)||Henry Cromwell, 2nd Baron Cromwell||1551||1593||
|-
|Baron Eure (1544)||William Eure, 2nd Baron Eure||1548||1594||
|-
|rowspan="2"|Baron Wharton (1545)||Thomas Wharton, 1st Baron Wharton||1545||1568||Died
|-
|Thomas Wharton, 2nd Baron Wharton||1568||1572||
|-
|rowspan="2"|Baron Sheffield (1547)||John Sheffield, 2nd Baron Sheffield||1549||1568||Died
|-
|Edmund Sheffield, 3rd Baron Sheffield||1568||1646||
|-
|rowspan="2"|Baron Rich (1547)||Richard Rich, 1st Baron Rich||1547||1567||Died
|-
|Robert Rich, 2nd Baron Rich||1567||1581||
|-
|Baron Willoughby of Parham (1547)||William Willoughby, 1st Baron Willoughby of Parham||1547||1570||
|-
|Baron Lumley (1547)||John Lumley, 1st Baron Lumley||1547||1609||
|-
|Baron Darcy of Aston (1548)||John Darcy, 2nd Baron Darcy of Aston||1558||1602||
|-
|Baron Darcy of Chiche (1551)||John Darcy, 2nd Baron Darcy of Chiche||1558||1581||
|-
|rowspan="3"|Baron Paget (1552)||William Paget, 1st Baron Paget||1552||1563||Died
|-
|Henry Paget, 2nd Baron Paget||1563||1568||Died
|-
|Thomas Paget, 3rd Baron Paget||1563||1589||
|-
|rowspan="2"|Baron North (1554)||Edward North, 1st Baron North||1554||1564||Died
|-
|Roger North, 2nd Baron North||1564||1600||
|-
|Baron Howard of Effingham (1554)||William Howard, 1st Baron Howard of Effingham||1554||1573||
|-
|Baron Chandos (1554)||Edmund Brydges, 2nd Baron Chandos||1557||1573||
|-
|Baron Hastings of Loughborough (1558)||Edward Hastings, 1st Baron Hastings of Loughborough||1558||1572||
|-
|Baron Hunsdon (1559)||Henry Carey, 1st Baron Hunsdon||1559||1596||
|-
|Baron St John of Bletso (1559)||Oliver St John, 1st Baron St John of Bletso||1559||1582||
|-
|Baron Buckhurst (1567)||Thomas Sackville, 1st Baron Buckhurst||1567||1608||New creation
|-
|}

Peerage of Scotland

|Duke of Rothesay (1398)||James Stuart, Duke of Rothesay||1566||1567||Acceded to the Throne of Scotland
|-
|Duke of Albany (1565)||Henry Stuart, 1st Duke of Albany||1565||1567||New creation; died, title succeeded by the Duke of Rothesay, and merged in the Crown in the same year
|-
|Duke of Orkney (1567)||James Hepburn, 1st Duke of Orkney||1567||1567||New creation; title forfeited
|-
|Earl of Mar (1114)||John Erskine, Earl of Mar||1565||1572||The Earldom was restored to him, as heir general of the Countess Isabel. Numbered variously as the 1st, 6th, or 18th Earl
|-
|rowspan=2|Earl of Sutherland (1235)||John Gordon, 11th Earl of Sutherland||1535||1567||Died
|-
|Alexander Gordon, 12th Earl of Sutherland||1567||1594||
|-
|Earl of Angus (1389)||Archibald Douglas, 8th Earl of Angus||1558||1588||
|-
|Earl of Crawford (1398)||David Lindsay, 10th Earl of Crawford||1558||1574||
|-
|rowspan=2|Earl of Menteith (1427)||John Graham, 4th Earl of Menteith||1543||1565||Died
|-
|William Graham, 5th Earl of Menteith||1565||1578||
|-
|rowspan=2|Earl of Huntly (1445)||George Gordon, 4th Earl of Huntly||1524||1562||Died; posthumously forfeited
|-
|George Gordon, 5th Earl of Huntly||1565||1579||Restored in 1565
|-
|Earl of Erroll (1452)||George Hay, 7th Earl of Erroll||1541||1573||
|-
|Earl of Caithness (1455)||George Sinclair, 4th Earl of Caithness||1529||1582||
|-
|Earl of Argyll (1457)||Archibald Campbell, 5th Earl of Argyll||1558||1573||
|-
|Earl of Atholl (1457)||John Stewart, 4th Earl of Atholl||1542||1579||
|-
|Earl of Morton (1458)||James Douglas, 4th Earl of Morton||1550||1581||
|-
|Earl of Rothes (1458)||Andrew Leslie, 5th Earl of Rothes||1558||1611||
|-
|Earl Marischal (1458)||William Keith, 4th Earl Marischal||1530||1581||
|-
|Earl of Buchan (1469)||Christina Stewart, 4th Countess of Buchan||1551||1580||
|-
|Earl of Glencairn (1488)||Alexander Cunningham, 5th Earl of Glencairn||1541||1574||
|-
|Earl of Bothwell (1488)||James Hepburn, 4th Earl of Bothwell||1556||1567||Created Duke of Orkney, see above
|-
|Earl of Lennox (1488)||Matthew Stewart, 4th Earl of Lennox||1526||1571||
|-
|Earl of Arran (1503)||James Hamilton, 2nd Earl of Arran||1529||1575||
|-
|Earl of Montrose (1503)||William Graham, 2nd Earl of Montrose||1513||1571||
|-
|Earl of Eglinton (1507)||Hugh Montgomerie, 3rd Earl of Eglinton||1546||1585||
|-
|Earl of Cassilis (1509)||Gilbert Kennedy, 4th Earl of Cassilis||1558||1576||
|-
|Earl of Moray (1562)||James Stewart, 1st Earl of Moray||1562||1570||New creation
|-
|Lord Erskine (1429)||John Erskine, 6th Lord Erskine||1552||1572||Succeeded as Earl of Mar, see above
|-
|rowspan=2|Lord Somerville (1430)||James Somerville, 6th Lord Somerville||1549||1569||Died
|-
|Hugh Somerville, 7th Lord Somerville||1569||1597||
|-
|Lord Haliburton of Dirleton (1441)||Janet Haliburton, 7th Lady Haliburton of Dirleton||1502||1560||Died; title succeeded by the Lord Ruthven
|-
|Lord Forbes (1442)||William Forbes, 7th Lord Forbes||1547||1593||
|-
|Lord Maxwell (1445)||John Maxwell, 8th Lord Maxwell||1555||1593||
|-
|Lord Glamis (1445)||John Lyon, 8th Lord Glamis||1558||1578||
|-
|rowspan=2|Lord Lindsay of the Byres (1445)||John Lindsay, 5th Lord Lindsay||1526||1563||Died
|-
|Patrick Lindsay, 6th Lord Lindsay||1563||1589||
|-
|Lord Saltoun (1445)||Alexander Abernethy, 6th Lord Saltoun||1543||1587||
|-
|Lord Gray (1445)||Patrick Gray, 4th Lord Gray||1541||1584||
|-
|Lord Sinclair (1449)||William Sinclair, 4th Lord Sinclair||1513||1570||
|-
|Lord Fleming (1451)||John Fleming, 5th Lord Fleming||1558||1572||
|-
|Lord Seton (1451)||George Seton, 7th Lord Seton||1549||1586||
|-
|rowspan=2|Lord Borthwick (1452)||John Borthwick, 5th Lord Borthwick||1542||1566||Died
|-
|William Borthwick, 6th Lord Borthwick||1566||1582||
|-
|Lord Boyd (1454)||Robert Boyd, 5th Lord Boyd||1558||1590||
|-
|rowspan=2|Lord Oliphant (1455)||Laurence Oliphant, 3rd Lord Oliphant||1516||1566||Died
|-
|Laurence Oliphant, 4th Lord Oliphant||1566||1593||
|-
|Lord Livingston (1458)||William Livingstone, 6th Lord Livingston||1553||1592||
|-
|Lord Cathcart (1460)||Alan Cathcart, 4th Lord Cathcart||1547||1618||
|-
|Lord Lovat (1464)||Hugh Fraser, 5th Lord Lovat||1558||1577||
|-
|rowspan=2|Lord Innermeath (1470)||John Stewart, 4th Lord Innermeath||1532||1569||Died
|-
|James Stewart, 5th Lord Innermeath||1569||1585||
|-
|Lord Carlyle of Torthorwald (1473)||Michael Carlyle, 4th Lord Carlyle||1526||1575||
|-
|Lord Home (1473)||Alexander Home, 5th Lord Home||1549||1575||
|-
|rowspan=2|Lord Ruthven (1488)||Patrick Ruthven, 3rd Lord Ruthven||1552||1566||Died
|-
|William Ruthven, 4th Lord Ruthven||1566||1584||
|-
|rowspan=3|Lord Crichton of Sanquhar (1488)||Robert Crichton, 6th Lord Crichton of Sanquhar||1550||1561||Died
|-
|Edward Crichton, 7th Lord Crichton of Sanquhar||1561||1569||Died
|-
|Robert Crichton, 8th Lord Crichton of Sanquhar||1569||1612||
|-
|Lord Drummond of Cargill (1488)||David Drummond, 2nd Lord Drummond||1519||1571||
|-
|Lord Hay of Yester (1488)||William Hay, 5th Lord Hay of Yester||1557||1586||
|-
|Lord Sempill (1489)||Robert Sempill, 3rd Lord Sempill||1552||1576||
|-
|Lord Herries of Terregles (1490)||Agnes Maxwell, 4th Lady Herries of Terregles||1543||1594||
|-
|Lord Ogilvy of Airlie (1491)||James Ogilvy, 5th Lord Ogilvy of Airlie||1549||1606||
|-
|Lord Ross (1499)||James Ross, 4th Lord Ross||1556||1581||
|-
|Lord Elphinstone (1509)||Robert Elphinstone, 3rd Lord Elphinstone||1547||1602||
|-
|Lord Methven (1528)||Henry Stewart, 2nd Lord Methven||1552||1572||
|-
|Lord Ochiltree (1543)||Andrew Stewart, 2nd Lord Ochiltree||1548||1591||
|-
|Lord Torphichen (1564)||James Sandilands, 1st Lord Torphichen||1564||1579||New creation
|-
|}

Peerage of Ireland

|Earl of Kildare (1316)||Gerald FitzGerald, 11th Earl of Kildare||1569||1585||Title restored
|-
|Earl of Ormond (1328)||Thomas Butler, 10th Earl of Ormond||1546||1614||
|-
|Earl of Desmond (1329)||Gerald FitzGerald, 14th Earl of Desmond||1558||1582||
|-
|rowspan=2|Earl of Waterford (1446)||Francis Talbot, 5th Earl of Waterford||1538||1560||Died
|-
|George Talbot, 6th Earl of Waterford||1560||1590||
|-
|rowspan=2|Earl of Tyrone (1542)||Brien O'Neill, 2nd Earl of Tyrone||1559||1562||Died
|-
|Hugh O'Neill, 3rd Earl of Tyrone||1562||1608||
|-
|Earl of Clanricarde (1543)||Richard Burke, 2nd Earl of Clanricarde||1544||1582||
|-
|Earl of Thomond (1543)||Connor O'Brien, 3rd Earl of Thomond||1553||1581||
|-
|Earl of Kildare (1554)||Gerald FitzGerald, 1st Earl of Kildare||1554||1585||Restored to the 1316 Earldom of Kildare, see above
|-
|Earl of Clancare (1565)||Donald McCarthy, 1st Earl of Clancare||1565||1597||New creation
|-
|rowspan=2|Viscount Gormanston (1478)||Jenico Preston, 3rd Viscount Gormanston||1532||1569||Died
|-
|Christopher Preston, 4th Viscount Gormanston||1569||1599||
|-
|Viscount Buttevant (1541)||James de Barry, 4th Viscount Buttevant||1557||1581||
|-
|Viscount Baltinglass (1541)||Rowland Eustace, 2nd Viscount Baltinglass||1549||1578||
|-
|Viscount Mountgarret (1550)||Richard Butler, 1st Viscount Mountgarret||1550||1571||
|-
|Viscount Decies (1569)||Maurice Fitzgerald, 1st Viscount Decies||1569||1572||New creation
|-
|Baron Athenry (1172)||Richard II de Bermingham||1547||1580||
|-
|Baron Kingsale (1223)||Gerald de Courcy, 17th Baron Kingsale||1535||1599||
|-
|Baron Kerry (1223)||Thomas Fitzmaurice, 16th Baron Kerry||1550||1590||
|-
|Baron Slane (1370)||James Fleming, 9th Baron Slane||1517||1578||
|-
|Baron Howth (1425)||Christopher St Lawrence, 8th Baron Howth||1558||1589||
|-
|rowspan=2|Baron Killeen (1449)||Christopher Plunkett, 7th Baron Killeen||1556||1567||Died
|-
|James Plunkett, 8th Baron Killeen||1567||1595||
|-
|rowspan=2|Baron Trimlestown (1461)||Patrick Barnewall, 4th Baron Trimlestown||1538||1562||Died
|-
|Robert Barnewall, 5th Baron Trimlestown||1562||1573||
|-
|rowspan=2|Baron Dunsany (1462)||Christopher Plunkett, 6th Baron of Dunsany||1559||1564||Died
|-
|Patrick Plunkett, 7th Baron of Dunsany||1564||1601||
|-
|Baron Delvin (1486)||Christopher Nugent, 6th Baron Delvin||1559||1602||
|-
|Baron Power (1535)||John Power, 3rd Baron Power||1545||1592||
|-
|rowspan=2|Baron Dunboyne (1541)||Edmond Butler, 1st Baron Dunboyne||1541||1566||Died
|-
|James Butler, 2nd/12th Baron Dunboyne||1566||1624||
|-
|Baron Louth (1541)||Thomas Plunkett, 2nd Baron Louth||1555||1571||
|-
|Baron Upper Ossory (1541)||Barnaby Fitzpatrick, 1st Baron Upper Ossory||1541||1575||
|-
|Baron Inchiquin (1543)||Murrough McDermot O'Brien, 3rd Baron Inchiquin||1557||1573||
|-
|Baron Cahir (1543)||Edmund Butler, 2nd Baron Cahir||1558||1560||Died; title extinct
|-
|}

References

 

Lists of peers by decade
1560s in England
1560s in Ireland
16th century in England
16th century in Scotland
16th century in Ireland
16th-century English nobility
16th-century Scottish peers
16th-century Irish people
Peers